Khayele Grober (also transliterated as Chayele) (b. February 16, 1898 in Bialystok, Poland - d. December 10, 1978 in Haifa, Israel) was a theatre actor and playwright.

Early life
She was born into a Jewish family in Bialystok, which was then a part of the Pale of Settlement of the Russian  empire. Her father was a successful merchant, and Khayele graduated from a Russian high school before receiving private tuition in Yiddish and Hebrew. She spent the First World War in Moscow, where she trained as an actor at the Habima studio.

Career
After graduating from Habima, Khayele Grober's acting qualities quickly received the high praise of critics and audiences alike. In the words of the Yiddish lexikon:

She was one of the best known Yiddish actresses with her own distinctive style."

Her fame was not limited to the Yiddish cultural scene; in 1935 for instance she had several performances at one of the theatres in the Norwegian capital of Oslo, to great acclaim.

She was the author of several books and one stage play. One of her books was a memoir of her ten years at Habima in Moscow, parts of which were published in Yiddish magazines such as Di idishe tsaytung (The Jewish newspaper) in Buenos Aires, Keneder odler or Keneder Adler (Canadian eagle) in Montreal, and Di shtime (The voice) in Mexico.

After leaving the Soviet Union she eventually moved to Montreal, Canada in 1939, where she formed the Yidish Teater Group and introduced actors to the Stanislavski method.

Khayele Grober settled in Israel in 1966, and died in Haifa twelve years later.

Literary works
 Tsu der groyser velt (To the great world) (Buenos Aires, 1952), 209 pp - a depiction of Jewish everyday life
 Af fridlekhe erd (On peaceful soil) - stage play

References

1898 births
1978 deaths
Israeli stage actresses
Israeli male dramatists and playwrights
Polish stage actresses
Polish dramatists and playwrights